Podseredneye is a rural locality (a selo) and the administrative center of Podserednenskoye Rural Settlement, Alexeyevsky District, Belgorod Oblast, Russia. The population was 1,284 as of 2010. There are nine streets.

Geography 
Podseredneye is located 18 km northwest of Alexeyevka (the district's administrative centre) by road. Ilovka is the nearest rural locality.

References 

Rural localities in Alexeyevsky District, Belgorod Oblast
Biryuchensky Uyezd